Jo-Wilfried Tsonga won the title, defeating Jérémy Chardy 6–4, 7–6(7–5) in the final.

Seeds

Draw

Finals

Top half

Bottom half

Qualifying
Every player received a bye into the second round, so the first round has been omitted.

Seeds

Qualifiers

Qualifying draw

First qualifier

Second qualifier

Third qualifier

Fourth qualifier

External links
Draw
Qualifying Draw

Singles